The 1944 Orange Bowl was a postseason college football bowl game between the LSU Tigers and Texas A&M Aggies. It was the 10th edition of the Orange Bowl. The teams had met in the regular season, with Texas A&M winning at LSU 28–13. LSU however defeated Texas A&M 19–14 in the bowl rematch. Despite A&M coach Homer Norton devising a game-plan specifically to stop him, halfback Steve Van Buren was responsible for all points scored by the Tigers, as he ran for two touchdowns, threw for one more, and kicked LSU's only successful extra point attempt.

Scoring summary
LSU - Van Buren 11-yard run reverse (kick failed)
LSU - Goode 24-yard pass from Van Buren (kick failed)
Texas A&M - Burditt 21-yard pass from Hallmark (Burditt kick)
LSU - Van Buren 63-yard run (Van Buren kick)
Texas A&M - Settegast 18-yard pass from Hallmark (Burditt kick)

Statistics

See also
 LSU–Texas A&M football rivalry

References

Orange Bowl
Orange Bowl
LSU Tigers football bowl games
Texas A&M Aggies football bowl games
Orange Bowl
January 1944 sports events